Maurice Hughes (born June 3, 1984 in Atlanta, Georgia) is an American soccer player currently playing for Northern Virginia Royals in the USL Premier Development League.

Career

College and amateur
Maurice Hughes began his college career in 2002 at the NJCAA powerhouse Yavapai College. There Hughes helped lead Yavapai College to back-to-back NJCAA National Soccer Championships for the 2002 & 2003 seasons. Hughes scored 10 goals with 10 assists his freshman season for the Roughriders. Hughes then led the team to its 2nd National title his sophomore season with 29 goals. In 2003, Hughes was named the MVP of the National Tournament.

In 2010 Hughes was Inducted into the NJCAA Men's Soccer Coaches Association Hall of Fame. Hughes was inducted with fellow Yavapai College Alumni Michael Randolph from the 2004-2005 teams.

Professional
Hughes signed a professional contract with the Atlanta Silverbacks of the USL First Division in 2006.

In December 2008, he signed with Real Maryland FC of the USL Second Division, but terminated his contract before the season began; instead, he signed with the Northern Virginia Royals in the USL Premier Development League.

References

 2006 USL First Division Week 15 Goal of the Week
 Hughes signs with Real Maryland for 2009 season.
 Final 2006 Supplemental Draft list announced
 In the 60th minute Hughes struck again

1984 births
Living people
American soccer players
Yavapai Roughriders men's soccer players
UAB Blazers men's soccer players
Legacy 76 players
Atlanta Silverbacks players
Northern Virginia Royals players
USL First Division players
USL League Two players
Association football midfielders